The Wagar Women's Knockout Teams national bridge championship is held at the summer American Contract Bridge League (ACBL) North American Bridge Championship (NABC).

The Wagar Women's Knockout Teams is a knock-out team event.
The event is restricted to female players.

History
The Wagar Women's Knockout Teams is a competition for teams of four to six females that is scored by IMPs with Swiss qualifying.

Until 1976 there was only one "National" Women's Team championship — and that was a board-a-match event.

The winners have their names inscribed on the Wagar Trophy, which honors one of the all-time great players. Margaret Wagar (1902-1990), inducted into the ACBL Bridge Hall of Fame in 1999, became Life Master #37 in 1943, the fifth woman to earn the rank. She and Kay Rhodes share one of the most remarkable achievements in ACBL history, winning the premier championship for women pairs in four consecutive years, 1955 to 1958 (Whitehead Women's Pairs).

Winners

One Women's Knockout Teams champion defended its title without any change in personnel, in 2001. The first winner under the knockout format, in 1976, had won the last two premier championships for women teams under board-a-match conditions in 1974 and 1975. (See Sternberg Women's Board-a-Match Teams, a 21st-century name for the board-a-match event, which is no longer premier for women teams.)

Mary Jane Farrell won the premier women teams championship ten times from 1964 to 1990, six under board-a-match format and four Wagar Knockouts.

See also
 Sternberg Women's Board-a-Match Teams – formerly the Women's Board-a-Match Teams; as the premier North American competition for women teams from 1933 to 1975, predecessor to the Wagar Knockout

References

Other sources
 List of previous winners, Page 9. 

 2008 winners, Page 1. 

 "Search Results: Wagar Womens KO". 1933 to present. ACBL. Visit "NABC Winners"; select a Fall NABC. Retrieved 2014-06-04. 

 This tabulation incorporates the premier women teams championship played under "BAM" rather than "KO" format, 1933 to 1975.

External links 

 NABC Winners: Wagar Womens Knockout Teams – official database view, all years
 Under the name "Wagar Womens Knockout Teams" this view covers the premier North American tournament for women teams: Women's Board-a-Match Teams from 1933 to 1975; Wagar Knockout Teams from 1976 to present.

North American Bridge Championships